Quirijn or Coryn Boel the Younger (1620 – 1668) was a Flemish engraver.

Life
Boel was born in Antwerp as the son of Jan Boel.  He was the nephew of Quirijn Boel the Elder. Boel worked in Antwerp and in Brussels.

His three children were born and baptized in Brussels between 1656 and 1661. The godfathers of the children included prominent painters active in Brussels who were originally from Antwerp such as David Teniers the Younger and Peter Snayers.

He died in either Antwerp or Brussels.

Work
Boel is known for engravings after old master paintings, most notably a selection of paintings for David Teniers the Younger for his Theatrum Pictorium.

References

1620 births
1668 deaths
Artists from Antwerp
Flemish engravers